Chandragrohon: The Lunar Eclipse is a Bangladeshi film based on a short story written by Indian Bengali author Syed Mustafa Siraj. The film was released 2008 and younger director Murad Parvez first time directed the film. The film features Riaz, Sohana Saba, and Champa in lead roles along with Shahiduzzaman Selim, KS Firoz, Dilara Zaman, Kohinur, Gazi Rakayet, Azom Faruk and Kazi Riton in supporting roles. 
In 2008, the film won three National Film Awards and including other four awards.

Story 
A mad woman (Champa) lived near the Marwari Ghat. People from the market had physical relationship with her at nights. As a result, she became pregnant. Moyra Masi (Dilara Zaman) starts to look after her in this circumstances. One rainy night, she gives birth a little girl and after four years she(champa) died. Moyra Masi looks after the little girl. The girl (Sohana Saba) does not get any name and so everyone calls her Falani.

Cast 
 Riaz - Kasu
 Sohana Saba - Falani
 Champa - Sokhi Pagli
 Shahiduzzaman Selim - Ismail Driver
 KS Firoz - Abul
 Dilara Zaman  - Moyra Mashi
 Kohinur - Modon
 Gazi Rakayet - Shombhu
 Azom Faruk - Marwari owner of Caubeji
 Kazi Riton - Raja

Music 

Chandragrohon film songs were composed by Habib Wahid and Imon Saha. The film Song written by Kabir Bakul, Jewel Mahmud, Mohammad Rafiquzzaman, and Arko Mostofa. There is total  11 songs in the film. Singers are Habib Wahid, Samina Chowdhury, Nancy, Dinat Jahan Munni and Subir Nandi.

Song list

Awards

Rainbow Film Festival
 The winner of the 2009 Best Movies

National Film Awards 
Chandragrohon won National Film Award and also other four awards totally seven sections.
 Won Best Director - Murad Parvez
 Won Best Dialogue - Murad Parvez
 Won Best Screenwriter - Murad Parvez
 Won Best Producer - Azom Faruk
 Won Best Music Director - Imon Saha and Habib Wahid
 Won Best Actress in a Supporting Role - Champa and Dilara Jaman
 Won Best Actor in a Negative Role - Jahirauddn Peer

Meril Prothom Alo Awards 
Chandragrohon won two Meril Prothom Alo Awards:
 Won Best Film
 Won Best Director - Murad Parvez.

Bacasasa Film and Culture Award 
 Won: Best Film - Azom Faruk

See also
 Brihonnola
 Hridoyer Kotha

References

External links 
 
 Chandragrohon on BMDb

2008 films
2008 drama films
Bengali-language Bangladeshi films
Bangladeshi drama films
Films scored by Habib Wahid
Films scored by Emon Saha
Films scored by Ali Akram Shuvo
Films directed by Murad Parvez
2000s Bengali-language films
 
Best Film Bachsas Award winners
Best Film National Film Award (Bangladesh) winners
Films whose writer won the Best Screenplay National Film Award (Bangladesh)